The Judgement of Solomon is an oil on canvas painting by Matthias Stom, created c. 1640, representing the Judgement of Solomon. Previously owned by Principe Carcafa d'Andria of Naples, it is now in the Museum of Fine Arts Houston, whose purchase of it in 1970 was funded by the Laurence H. Favrot Bequest.

References

External links
 Google Arts and Culture entry

1640 paintings
Paintings by Matthias Stom
Paintings in the collection of the Museum of Fine Arts, Houston
Stom, Houston